Flavio Manzoni (born 7 January 1965 in Nuoro, Sardinia) is an Italian architect and automobile designer. He is the Senior Vice President of Design at Ferrari from January 2010 and he has led in the creation of many Ferrari models including the Ferrari F12berlinetta, in collaboration with Pininfarina; LaFerrari, the first hybrid of the little horse, also born from his pencil, and in 2014 he gained the Compasso d'Oro for the F12berlinetta project (together with Pininfarina and Ferrari Style Center). 

He made (with Alberto Dilillo) the Lancia Fulvia Coupé concept presented in 2003 at the automobile exhibition of Francoforte, for the Lancia Ypsilon and Lancia Musa who won the "European Automotive Design Award". Furthermore, he has been also the creative director of the Volkswagen group from 2000 to 2009.

Career

Manzoni studied Architecture at University of Florence, specializing in industrial design. In 1993 he joined the Centro Stile Lancia, and three years later he was made responsible for Interior Design of the marque. He worked on various projects such as the interiors of the Lancia Dialogos and Lancia Thesis. In 1999, he moved to Barcelona to become Interior Design Director at SEAT, and working in the interiors of the production cars SEAT Altea and SEAT León, and the concept cars SEAT Salsa and SEAT Tango.

In 2001 Manzoni returned to Lancia and was appointed Design Director. He took charge of the concept cars Lancia Granturismo, Lancia Granturismo Stilnovo and Lancia Fulvia Coupé Concept, great success at the Frankfurt Motor Show in 2003, and the production cars Lancia Ypsilon and Lancia Musa, winning the '"European Automotive Design Award" in 2003.In 2004 he was appointed Director of Design of Fiat, Lancia and Fiat LCV, beginning work on the Fiat Grande Punto, the new Fiat 500, and the Fiat Fiorino/Qubo.

In 2006, with other authors, he wrote L'automobile italiana published by Giunti Editore. The same year, he moved to the Volkswagen group joining Audi, becoming in February 2007 the artistic director of the Volkswagen group "north" pole, where he began to work on a new stylistic image of the Volkswagen, Skoda, Bentley and Bugatti brands. He designed the concept Up!, followed by the Scirocco model and the Volkswagen Golf restyling, called Golf VI, presenting the "Golf Plus" version at 2008 Bologna Motorshow. Also in 2007 he became a member of the iF-Award Product Design jury.

From 12 January 2010 he joined Ferrari as director of design, replacing Donato Coco and creating an internal, complete and autonomous Style Center for the first time in the history of the brand. Ferrari FF is the first production car he oversee development with. He presented the Ferrari SA Aperta roadster at the 2010 Paris Motor Show. In 2012, at the Geneva Motor Show, he presented the Ferrari F12berlinetta, heir of the Ferrari 599 GTB Fiorano and the first Ferrari developed by the Ferrari Style Center in collaboration with Pininfarina. Thanks to F12berlinetta he won the Auto Bild Design Award 2012, as the most beautiful car in Europe, and the Golden Steering Wheel. In 2013 he made the heir of Enzo Ferrari: La Ferrari. He oversaw the lightening and aerodynamic redesign of the Ferrari 458 Speciale. In 2011 Flavio Manzoni was included into the Automobile Design Hall of Fame at the National Automobile Museum in Turin, Italy.

In May 2014 he received the Compasso d'Oro award in the name of Ferrari, which rewards the combination of technology and design of the Ferrari F12 Berlinetta.  

In December 2016 the Ferrari J50 was presented in Tokyo. Designed by Flavio Manzoni together with the Ferrari style center, it is a sports car produced in a limited edition to celebrate Ferrari's fifty years of presence in Japan. Among his latest works there are the F12 TdF (Tour de France), the most extreme version of the F12berlinetta, the Ferrari GTC4Lusso, sophisticated four-seater 690 HP coupé, the 488GTB sportscar and the 488 Spider open version and the California T, with important technical innovations. 

With his team he is directing the project of the "New Ferrari Style Center" in the production site of Ferrari S.p.A. based in Maranello (Modena). Each of the four floors of the new building is dedicated to a different project design stage.

In December 2014 on Yas Marina Circuit in Abu Dhabi, his FXX-K was presented as the most powerful Ferrari ever. Although partially based on the very first hybrid car produced in Maranello, LaFerrari, the FXX-K is in fact a completely new car.

In March 2017, the Ferrari 812 Superfast was presented at the Geneva Motor Show, designed by the Ferrari Style Center led by Flavio Manzoni. In September, the new Ferrari Portofino is presented at the Frankfurt Motor Show.

He oversees the project of the "New Ferrari Style Center" inside the Ferrari production plant in Maranello (Modena). The new building, inaugurated on 18 September 2018, is spread over four levels with natural lights and open spaces. The top floor contains a high-tech room [unclear] for the presentation of the projects. The Style Center also houses the company's Tailor Made department.

In September 2018 Manzoni presented the Ferrari SP38 Deborah at the Grand Basel Show demonstrating his great passion for design: “It's so important to show the shape of a car as it was intended, as a masterpiece or a work of art. These presentation frames are great at stimulating contemplation – normally, we’re used to seeing cars in noisy and chaotic environments. But here, there's nothing but the car, its name, and its date. There are no distractions.”

The University of Sassari awarded him an honorary degree in Modern Philology and Cultural Industry on 28 June 2019 and Manzoni proposes a Lectio Doctoralis entitled Ferrari Design The metalanguage of form.

For the partnership between Ferrari and Hublot, the historic luxury watchmaking fashion house, in 2019 he designed of the Hublot Classic Fusion Ferrari GT watch, inspired by the Ferrari "Gran Turismo" universe.

Designs

 Lancia Dialogos (interiors) (1998)
 Lancia Thesis (interiors) (2001)
 Seat Tango (2001)
 Lancia Granturismo Stilnovo concept (2003)
 Lancia Fulvia Coupé concept (2003)
 Lancia Ypsilon (2003)  
 Lancia Musa (2004)
 Volkswagen Scirocco III (2008)
 Volkswagen Golf VI (2008)
 Volkswagen BlueSport Concept (2009)
 Ferrari SA Aperta (2010)
 Ferrari FF [F151] (2011)
 Ferrari Superamerica 45 [SP10] (2011)
 Ferrari F12 Berlinetta [F152] (2012)
 Ferrari GT Aperta One-off [SP15] (2012)
 Ferrari SP12 EC [SP12] (2012)
 Ferrari SP30 [SP14] (2012)
 Ferrari LaFerrari [F150] (2013)
 Ferrari 458 Speciale [F142 VS] (2013)
 Ferrari FFX [SP18] (2013)
 Ferrari California T [F149M] (2014)
 Ferrari SP America [SP20] (2014)
 Ferrari F12 TRS One-off [SP28] (2014)
 Ferrari 458 Speciale A (2014)
 Ferrari F60 America [FNA] (2014)
 Ferrari FXX-K [F150 XX] (2014)
 Ferrari Sergio (2014)
 Ferrari 488 GTB (2015)
 Ferrari 488 Spider (2015)
 Ferrari F12 TDF (2015)
 Ferrari GTC4 Lusso (2016)
 Ferrari GTC4 Lusso T (2016)
 Ferrari 458 MM Speciale [SP32] (2016)
 Ferrari LaFerrari Aperta (2016)
 Ferrari 488 Challenge (2016)
 Ferrari SP275 RW Competizione One-off (2016)
 Ferrari J50 (2016)
 Ferrari 812 Superfast [F152M] (2017)
 Ferrari FXX-K EVO [F150 EVO] (2017)
 Ferrari Portofino [F164] (2017)
 Ferrari 488 Pista [F142M VS] (2018)
 Ferrari GS cinquanta [SP37] (2018)
 Ferrari SP38 One-off (2018)
 Ferrari 488 Pista Spider [F142M VS Spider] (2018)
 Ferrari Monza SP1 [F176] (2018)
 Ferrari Monza SP2 [SP40] (2018)
 Ferrari SP3JC [SP39] (2018)
 Ferrari P80/C [SP36] (2019)
 Ferrari F8 Tributo [F142M FL] (2019)
 Ferrari SF90 Stradale [F173] (2019)
 Ferrari F8 Spider [F142M FL Spider] (2019)
 Ferrari 812GTS [F152M RHT] (2019)
 Ferrari 488 Challenge EVO [F142 CHP EVO] (2019)
 Ferrari F169 [Roma] (2019)
 Ferrari Portofino M [F164 FL] (2020)
 Ferrari Omologata One-off [SP43] (2020)
 Ferrari SF90 Spider [F173 Spider] (2020)
 Ferrari 812 Competizione [F152M VS] (2021)
 Ferrari 812 Competizione A [F152M VS Targa] (2021)
 Ferrari 296 GTB [F171 Coupé] (2021)
 Ferrari Daytona SP3 [F150 BD] (2021)
 Ferrari BR20 [SP46] (2021)
 Ferrari 296 GTS [F171 Spider] (2022)
 Ferrari SP48 Unica [SP48] (2022) 
 Ferrari Purosangue (2022)
 Ferrari SP51 One-off (2022)
 Ferrari 499P (2022)
 Ferrari Vision Gran Turismo (2022)

FBX 

 Poltrona Cockpit (2017)
 Ferrari/Hublot Techframe (Basilea - 2017)
 Ferrari/Hublot Classic Fusion GT (Basilea - 2019)
 RM UP-01 Ferrari/Richard Mille (2022)

Building 

 Nuovo Centro Stile (Maranello - 2018)

Awards 
The Ferrari Design team headed by Flavio Manzoni has received numerous international awards and recognitions for its car models:

2012

 Auto Bild Design Award - F12berlinetta - Hamburg

2013

 Design Award Autoscout24 - LaFerrari – München
 Mamuthone ad Honorem - Cagliari

2014

 Compasso d’Oro ADI - Ferrari F12berlinetta - Milan
 Auto Design Award - LaFerrari - Geneva
 Born Ultimate Design for Ferrari Cars - Courchevel

2015

 Red Dot Best of The Best - Ferrari FXX-K - Essen
 Red Dot - Ferrari LaFerrari - Essen
 Red Dot - Ferrari California T – Essen

2016

 Compasso d’Oro ADI - Ferrari FXX-K - Milan
 iF Gold Design Award - Ferrari FXX-K - München
 iF Design Award - Ferrari 488 GTB - Munchen
 iF Design Award - Ferrari 488 Spider - München
 Red Dot Best of The Best - Ferrari 488 GTB - Essen
 Autonis Design Award - Ferrari 488 Spider - Stuttgart
 Good Design Award Chicago Athenaeum - Ferrari F12tdf - Chicago
 Good Design Award Chicago Athenaeum - Ferrari 488 Spider - Chicago

2017

 Most Beautiful Supercar of the Year - International Automobile Festival - Ferrari GTC4Lusso – Paris
 Good Design Award Chicago Athenaeum - Ferrari GTC4Lusso - Chicago
 Good Design Award Chicago Athenaeum - Ferrari J50 - Chicago
 Good Design Award Chicago Athenaeum - Ferrari 812 Superfast - Chicago
 iF Gold Design Award - Ferrari GTC4Lusso - München
 iF Design Award - Ferrari 458 MM Speciale – München
 Red Dot - LaFerrari Aperta - Essen
 Red Dot - Ferrari GTC4Lusso - Essen
 Red Dot - 458MM Speciale - Essen
 Red Dot Best of The Best - Ferrari J50- Essen

2018

 iF Design Award - LaFerrari Aperta – München
 iF Gold Design Award - Ferrari J50 – München
 Red Dot Design Award - Ferrari FXX-K Evo – Essen
 Red Dot Design Award - Ferrari 812 Superfast – Essen
 Red Dot Best of The Best – Ferrari Portofino – Essen
 Design Award for Concept Cars & Prototypes Concorso d’Eleganza Villa d’Este – Ferrari SP38 - Cernobbio
 Auto Europa 2019 Uiga – Ferrari Portofino – Roma
 Menzione d’onore Compasso d’oro ADI – Ferrari J50

2019

 Most Beautiful Supercar of the Year - Ferrari Monza SP2 – Paris
 iF Design Award – Ferrari 488 Pista – München
 iF Design Award – Ferrari SP38 – München
 iF Design Award – Ferrari Portofino – München
 iF Gold Design Award – Ferrari Monza SP1 – München
 Red Dot Design Team of the Year 2019 - Flavio Manzoni and the Ferrari Design Team – Essen
 Red Dot Best of The Best – Ferrari Monza SP1 – Essen
 Red Dot Design Award– Ferrari 488 Pista – Essen
 Red Dot Design Award – Ferrari SP38 – Essen
 Award “Design” Orologio dell'Anno– Classic Fusion Ferrari GT – Milan
 Good Design Award Chicago Athenaeum - Ferrari Monza SP1 – Chicago
 Good Design Award Chicago Athenaeum - Ferrari SF90 Stradale – Chicago
 American Prize for Design - Chicago Athenaeum and The European Centre for Architecture Art Design and Urban Studies

2020

 Most Beautiful Supercar of the Year - Ferrari Roma – Paris
 iF Gold Award Design Award– Ferrari SF90 Stradale – München
 iF Design Award – Ferrari F8 Tributo – München
 iF Design Award – Ferrari P80/C– München
 Red Dot Best of The Best – Ferrari SF90 Stradale – Essen
 Red Dot Design Award– Ferrari Roma – Essen
 Red Dot Design Award – Ferrari F8 Tributo – Essen
 XXVI PREMIO COMPASSO D’ORO – Ferrari Monza SP1- Milano
 Car Design Award 2020 – Ferrari Roma – Milano;
 Good Design Award Chicago Athenaeum - Ferrari Roma – Chicago

2021

 Red Dot Design Award – Ferrari SF90 Spider – Essen
 Red Dot Design Award – Ferrari Omologata– Essen
 iF Design Award – Ferrari Roma
 iF Design Award – Ferrari SF90 Spider
 AUTONIS - Best New Design 2021-Auto Motor und Sport - Ferrari Portofino M
 Most Beautiful Supercar of the Year - Ferrari Daytona SP3 – Paris
 Good Design Award Chicago Athenaeum - Ferrari 812 Competizione – Chicago
 Good Design Award Chicago Athenaeum - Ferrari 812 Competizione A – Chicago
 Good Design Award Chicago Athenaeum - Ferrari SF90 Spider – Chicago
 Good Design Award Chicago Athenaeum - Ferrari Omologata – Chicago

2022

 Red Dot Best of The Best – Ferrari Daytona SP3 – Essen
 Red Dot Design Award– Ferrari 296 GTB – Essen
 Red Dot Design Award– Ferrari Competizione – Essen
 Red Dot Design Award– Ferrari Competizione A – Essen
 iF Design Award – Ferrari 296 GTB
 iF Design Award – Ferrari Competizione
 iF Design Award – Ferrari Competizione A
 Car Design Award 2022 – Ferrari 296 GTB – Milano;
 EyesOn Design Award 2022 – Ferrari Daytona SP3;
 AUTONIS - Auto Motor und Sport - Best New Design 2022 (TBC)- Ferrari 296 GTB

References 

1965 births
Architects from Sardinia
Living people
Ferrari people
Italian automobile designers
Compasso d'Oro Award recipients